Congo is a village in Eurobodalla Shire on the South Coast of New South Wales. Congo is located 315 km south of Sydney, and 10 km south of Moruya.

Congo Creek flows to the Tasman Sea at the northern end of the village. Congo's beach is noted as a good location for surfing, with a colloquial name "The Suck". Beach safe classes the hazard of the unpatrolled Congo beach as 6/10 "Moderately hazardous".

National parks and Aboriginal heritage
Congo is a village surrounded by Eurobodalla National Park on three sides, and the ocean (Tasman Sea) on the east.

Congo campground is situated on Congo Creek within the national park. It is a good base for walking the 14 km Bingi Dreaming track described by the National Parks and Wildlife Service as "a coastal walk that traces the ancient Song Lines of the Yuin Aboriginal people".

Aboriginal people have occupied the area for over 6000 years, prior to the sea reaching current levels.

Eurobodalla Coast Tourism notes that the Congo area was a major source of silcrete, used to make stone tools. Silcrete was widely traded throughout the region.

Wildlife
Eurobodalla Shire Council reports that the greater glider is endangered, and has been recruiting residents to undertake spotlighting as part of the Bingie Congo Glider project.

Land use and planning
The current option for the future Moruya bypass will destroy a 1.5km long nature strip along Noad's Drive at the entrance to Congo. A petition has recently been started to try to re-route the proposed development.

A small area on Congo Creek may be affected by rising sea levels. 

A parcel of land on Congo Creek at the north of the village has been identified as Endangered Ecological Community "25 South Coast Swamp Forest - Casuarina glauca".

Outside the village and national park, Eurobodalla Shire Council's planning map shows land classified as agricultural class 1-4 and 5.

Crafts
Congo's one commercial business is the Congo Crafts Gallery & Studio. It features paintings, tapestry, hand-loom weaving and jewellery with wood-fired and gas-fired ceramics with a wide range of glazing techniques.

References

Towns in New South Wales
Towns in the South Coast (New South Wales)
Eurobodalla Shire